Del Rey Manga was the manga-publishing imprint of Del Rey Books, a branch of Ballantine Books, which in turn is part of Random House, the publishing division of Bertelsmann.

History
Del Rey Manga was formed as part of a cross-publishing relationship with Japanese publisher Kodansha. Some of the Del Rey titles, such as Tsubasa Chronicle and xxxHolic, are published in the United Kingdom by Tanoshimi. Tricia Narwani, the editor of Del Rey, stated that "Del Rey finds most of its talent through conventions and existing professional contacts".

In October 2010, Kodansha and Random House announced that the US division of Kodansha, Kodansha USA, will take over publishing over all Del Rey Manga titles as well as their own manga, starting on December 1. Random House will act as the sales and marketing distributor.

Titles
Del Rey made its debut in May 2004 with four manga titles:

 Mobile Suit Gundam Seed (Kidō Senshi Gundam SEED) - by Masatsugu Iwase
 Negima! Magister Negi Magi (Mahō Sensei Negima!) - by Ken Akamatsu
 Tsubasa: Reservoir Chronicle - by Clamp
 xxxHolic - by Clamp

It has since then licensed additional titles:
 A Perfect Day for Love Letters (Koibumi Biyori) - by George Asakura
 Air Gear - by Oh! great
 Code:Breaker - by Akimine Kamijyo
 Alive (manga) - by Tadashi Kawashima (story) and Adachitoka (art)
 Dragon Eye - by Kairi Fujiyama
 ES (Eternal Sabbath) - by Fuyumi Soryo
 Fairy Navigator Runa - by Miyoko Ikeda (story) and Michiyo Kikuta (art)
 Fairy Tail - by Hiro Mashima
 Free Collars Kingdom - by Takuya Fujima
 Gacha Gacha - by Hiroyuki Tamakoshi
 Gacha Gacha: The Next Revolution - by Hiroyuki Tamakoshi
 Gakuen Prince - by Jun Yuzuki
 Gankutsuou: The Count of Monte Cristo - by Mahiro Maeda
 Genshiken - by Shimoku Kio
 Ghost Hunt - by Shiho Inada (story and art) and Fuyumi Ono (original novel)
 Guru Guru Pon-chan - by Satomi Ikezawa
 Haridama Magic Cram School by Atsushi Suzumi
 Hell Girl (Jigoku Shōjo) - by Miyuki Eto
 Kagetora - by Akira Segami
 Kamichama Karin Chu - by Koge-Donbo
 Kitchen Princess - by Miyuki Kobayashi (story) and Natsumi Ando (art)
 Koko ni iru yo! - by Ema Toyama
 Kujibiki Unbalance - by Kio Shimoku (story) and Kōme Keito (art)
 Kurogane - by Kei Tōme
 Le Chevalier D'Eon - by Tow Ubukata (original creator) and Kiriko Yumeji (art)
 Love Roma - by Minoru Toyoda
 Mamotte! Lollipop - by Michiyo Kikuta
 Mao-Chan - by Ken Akamatsu (story) and RAN (art)
 Me and the Devil Blues - by Akira Hiramoto
 Mermaid Melody Pichi Pichi Pitch - by Michiko Yokote (story) and Pink Hanamori (art)
 Minima! - by Machiko Sakurai
 Mobile Suit Gundam SEED Destiny - by Masatsuga Iwase
 Moyasimon: Tales of Agriculture – by Masayuki Ishikawa
 Mushishi - by Yuki Urushibara
 My Heavenly Hockey Club - by Ai Morinaga
 Negima! Neo - by Ken Akamatsu (story) and Takuya Fujiyama (art)
 Night Head Genesis - by George Ida (story) and You Higuri (art)
 Nodame Cantabile - by Tomoko Ninomiya
 Othello - by Satomi Ikezawa
 Papillon - by Miwa Ueda
 Parasyte (Kiseiju) - by Hitoshi Iwaaki
 Pastel - by Toshihiko Kobayashi
 Pink Innocent - by Kotori Momoyuki
 Princess Resurrection (Kaibutsu Ōjo) - by Yasunori Mitsunaga
 Psycho Busters - by Yuya Aoki (story) and Akinari Nao (art)
 Pumpkin Scissors - by Ryōtarō Iwanaga
 Q·Ko-Chan: The Earth Invader Girl - by Hajime Ueda
 Rave Master - by Hiro Mashima
 Samurai 7 - by Akira Kurosawa
 Sayonara, Zetsubou-Sensei - by Koji Kumeta
 School Rumble - by Jin Kobayashi
 Shiki Tsukai - by To-Ru Zekuu
 Shugo Chara! - by Peach-Pit
 Sugar Sugar Rune - by Moyoco Anno
 Train Man (Densha Otoko) - by Machiko Ocha
 The Wallflower (also known as Perfect Girl Evolution or My Fair Lady) - by Tomoko Hayakawa
 Phoenix Wright: Ace Attorney (based on the Nintendo DS game series) - by Kenji Kuroda
 Yokaiden by Nina Matsumoto
 Yozakura Quartet by Suzuhito Yasuda

Mature line
In early December 2005 it was announced that Del Rey Manga would begin publishing a mature line of manga. It included:

 Basilisk - by Futaro Yamada (story) and Masaki Segawa (art)
 The Yagyu Ninja Scrolls - by Masaki Segawa
 Suzuka - by Kōji Seo

OEL titles
Del Rey also publishes the following original English-language manga (OEL) titles:

 Bakugan Battle Brawlers
 Ben 10 Alien Force
 In Odd We Trust
 Kasumi (comic) - by Surt Lim (story) and Hirofumi Sugimoto (art)
 Yōkaiden
 King of RPGs

Partnership with Marvel
Del Rey Manga teamed up with Marvel Comics to produce manga versions of their titles (previous attempts, like Marvel Mangaverse and X-Men: The Manga, had variable success). Titles confirmed are:

 Wolverine: Prodigal Son by writer Antony Johnston, with art by Wilson Tortosa
 X-Men Misfits by writers Raina Telgemeier and Dave Roman, with art by Anzu

References

External links

 Del Rey - MANGA—official site.

 
Manga distributors
Defunct comics and manga publishing companies
2004 establishments in New York City
2010 disestablishments in New York (state)
Comic book imprints

ja:デル・レイ・ブックス